Sheffield City Council elections took place on Thursday 1 May 2008. There were 30 seats up for election - one of the three councillors from each ward, plus two seats from Labour councillors who had stepped down. Liberal Democrats made several gains, regaining control of the council for the first time since losing it in 2002. The overall turnout for this election was 36.8%.

Councillors before and after the election

Election result

The Liberal Democrats gained five seats from their position following the 2004 election, but also regained a seat lost to an Independent via defection in Stocksbridge & Upper Don.

Ward results

Arbourthorne

Beauchief & Greenhill

Beighton

Birley

Broomhill

Burngreave

Central

Crookes

Darnall

Dore & Totley

East Ecclesfield

Ecclesall

Firth Park

Fulwood

Gleadless Valley

Graves Park

Hillsborough

Manor Castle

Mosborough

Nether Edge

Richmond

Shiregreen & Brightside

Southey

Stannington

Stocksbridge & Upper Don
 
 
 
 
 
 
 
 
 
 
Stocksbridge & Upper Don was a regain for the Liberal Democrats, after the sitting councillor became an Independent.

Walkley

West Ecclesfield

Woodhouse

By-elections between 2008 and 2010

References

2008 English local elections
2008
2000s in Sheffield